In railway signalling, a moving block is a signalling block system where the blocks are defined in real time by computers as safe zones around each train. This requires both knowledge of the exact location and speed of all trains at any given time, and continual communication between the central signalling system and the train's cab signalling system. Moving block allows trains to run closer together (reduced headway) while maintaining required safety margins, thereby increasing the line's overall capacity. It may be contrasted with fixed block signalling systems. 

Communications Based Train Control (CBTC) or Transmission Based Signalling (TBS) is required to detect the exact location of trains and to transmit back the permitted operating speed to enable this flexibility. Information about train location can be gathered through active and passive markers along the tracks, and train-borne tachometers and speedometers. Satellite-based systems are not used because they do not work in tunnels.

Another version of the moving block system would be the location computers on the trains itself. Each train determines its location in relation to all the other trains and sets its safe speeds using this data. Less wayside equipment is required compared to the off-train system but the number of transmissions is much greater.

Implementation

Urban
Moving block is in use on several London Underground lines, including the Victoria, Jubilee, and Northern lines, and parts of the sub-surface lines. In London it is also used on the Docklands Light Railway and the core section of the Elizabeth line. New York City Subway's BMT Canarsie Line, Tren Urbano (Puerto Rico), Singapore's MRT, and Vancouver's SkyTrain, also employ moving block signalling. It is also used by the Hong Kong MTR, on the Tuen Ma line, Disneyland Resort line, South Island line and the East Rail line .

Inter-city
It was supposed to be the enabling technology on the modernisation of Britain's West Coast Main Line which would allow trains to run at a higher maximum speed, but the technology was deemed not mature enough, considering the large number of junctions on the line, and the plan was dropped. It forms part of the European Rail Traffic Management System's level-3 specification for future installation in the European Train Control System, which will at level 3 feature moving blocks that allow trains to follow each other at exact braking distances.

References

Railway signalling block systems